Lac Beauvert, or Beauvert Lake is a small lake (0.4 km2) in Jasper National Park, Alberta, Canada.

It is next to the Jasper Park Lodge, a Fairmont Hotels and Resorts property. The lake is 3 kilometres northeast of the town of Jasper. Lac Beauvert is a remanent of what was once a much larger lake that covered the entire Jasper valley, also encompassing the modern day nearby lakes of Patricia Lake, Pyramid Lake, Lake Edith and Lake Annette.

References

Beauvert
Jasper National Park